William Stones (2 October 1904 – 2 July 1969) was a Labour Party politician in the United Kingdom.

Biography

Stones was a member of the National Union of Mineworkers and worked as a mine inspector. At the 1955 general election, he was elected as Member of Parliament for Consett in County Durham. He held the seat until he retired from the House of Commons at the 1966 general election.

Stones' name is attached to a celebrated Parliamentary anecdote. On being challenged that he was a "bleeding idiot", he is said to have responded "There's an awful lot of bleeding idiots out there among the voters, and they deserve some representation too."

Sources
 
 'Friendly Folkestone' by Robin Oakley, The Spectator, 4 July 1998.

External links 
 

1904 births
1969 deaths
Labour Party (UK) MPs for English constituencies
National Union of Mineworkers-sponsored MPs
UK MPs 1955–1959
UK MPs 1959–1964
UK MPs 1964–1966